Buena Vista Township is a township in Jasper County, Iowa, United States.

History
Buena Vista Township was established in 1857.

References

Townships in Jasper County, Iowa
Townships in Iowa
1857 establishments in Iowa
Populated places established in 1857